Rob Stone (born July 12, 1968) is an American music, media and branding executive based in New York City. Stone is the founder of the full-service marketing agency Cornerstone, and co-founder of music and style publication The Fader.

Background 
Stone attended the University at Albany in 1986 where he studied marketing and finance. Upon graduation in 1990, Stone joined SBK Records and rose to director of promotion. He also served as vice president of promotion at EMI Records. In The Big Payback: The History of the Business of Hip-Hop, author and hip hop journalist Dan Charnas notes Stone's rise through the ranks at EMI. When label heads Daniel Glass and Fred Davis initially discussed bringing Sean "Puff Daddy" Combs and his label, Bad Boy, to EMI, they brought in Stone—aged 25—due to his background and knowledge of hip hop. Stone became seen as the record business counterpart to innovative radio programmers such as Keith Naftaly and Hosh Gureli.

Ventures 
In May 1994, Stone joined music executive Clive Davis at Arista Records.

Stone worked with Notorious B.I.G., Usher Raymond, and other artists, including Sean "Puffy" Combs, Outkast, and Faith Evans.

Stone is a member of the board of directors for Sweetgreen, a farm-to-table salad chain, playing an integral role in the creation of the brand's popular Sweetlife Festival, an annual concert.

He also sits on the board for the Children's Cancer Association's music medicine program, MyMusicRx, a digital playground that delivers music medicine to critically ill kids and teens in the United States and Canada.

Cornerstone 

In June 1996, Stone founded Cornerstone, a Manhattan-based music promotion firm that worked primarily with record labels to promote their artists.

After being joined by business partner and co-CEO Jon Cohen in 1997, the firm began to grow into a full-service marketing and creative agency recognized for its integration of hip music names in corporate branding campaigns. The agency's work with clients such as Converse, Microsoft, Nike, Mountain Dew and Diageo gave the agency a reputation as a pioneer in the movement of branding and music.

In 2009, Stone was featured on the cover of Billboard magazine's Music & Advertising issue with Cornerstone Co-Founder Jon Cohen and friend and marketing partner Pharrell Williams, where the agency was described as a pioneer in connecting musicians with brands.

The Fader 
In 1999, Stone co-founded The Fader with Jon Cohen. The Fader is a magazine dubbed by The New York Times as the new music-and-fashion bible. With its 39th issue, The Fader made publishing history was the first to offer a full issue's content available on iTunes.

Campaigns 
In his book, Charna's documents Stone's work on the original "Obey Your Thirst" Sprite campaign as Stone spearheaded Sprite's first DJ Summit, an event that brought together American radio jockeys and artists. In turn, this event eventually led to partnerships with hip hop acts such as at Fat Joe, Red Man, Missy Elliot, and Common, and the creation of the "Voltron" Sprite Hip Hop commercials.

Additional campaigns under Stone's direction at Cornerstone include Nike's “Better Than I've Ever Been”. Commissioned by the sportswear company at the 25th anniversary of Air Force One shoes, Cornerstone executive produced the song, secured Kanye West, Nas, KRS-One and Rakim to collaborate, and oversaw production with Rick Rubin. The track was nominated for the Grammy Award for "Best Rap Performance by a Duo or Group." My Drive Thru was a collaborative single by The Strokes lead vocalist Julian Casablancas, American singer-songwriter Santigold, and The Neptunes producer and N.E.R.D member Pharrell Williams. The song was created for Converse's centennial and was released in June 2008. Among Cornerstone's music related initiatives are Green Label Sound by Mountain Dew and Rubber Tracks, a recording studio managed by Converse in Brooklyn, NY.

In late 2010, Pepsi's chief engagement officer hired Cornerstone to do the creative on the brand's campaign, Pepsi MAX NFL Audible. TV spots aired during January 2011 NFL playoff games and online, featuring rappers Big Boi, Lupe Fiasco, B.o.B and Talib Kweli. In 2012, Pepsi also employed Cornerstone for the NFL Pepsi Anthems campaign featuring Kelly Clarkson, Travie McCoy, Wiz Khalifa and Kid Rock.

Cornerstone began construction on Rubber Tracks, a free recording studio managed by Cornerstone and operated by Converse in Brooklyn, NY, in 2010. The  space is open for free use to artists in the area.

References 

Living people
American music industry executives
1968 births